Manish Kumar Suman (born 25 August 1976) is a Nepalese politician. He is a member of the Province No. 2 Provincial Assembly, and currently represents Saptari 2 constituency. Suman left Rastriya Janata Party and joined People's Socialist Party, Nepal since 2020.

Early life
Manish Kumar Suman was born on 25 August 1976 in Kayastha family. His father is Sushil Kumar Lal and his mother is Yasodhara Devi Das. He has done Bachelor from SMBM College, Rajbiraj. He is pursuing his graduate degree in law from SMBM College, Saptari affiliated to Tribhuvan University.

Electoral record 
Since 2018, Suman has fought only one elections and has won the election by far majority votes.

References

Living people
1976 births
Nepalese Hindus
Members of the Provincial Assembly of Madhesh Province
Rastriya Janata Party Nepal politicians
People's Socialist Party, Nepal politicians